The Clutton-Tabenor FRED is a British homebuilt aircraft design introduced in 1963.

Design and development
The prototype FRED (Flying Runabout Experimental Design) was designed and built by E.C. Clutton and E.W. Sherry between 1957 and 1963. The aircraft, registered G-ASZY, first flew at Meir aerodrome, Stoke-on-Trent on 3 November 1963. It was a single-seat wood and fabric parasol monoplane powered originally by a Triumph 5T motorcycle engine. By 1968 it was flying with a converted Volkswagen engine. The Continental A-65  four stroke powerplant has also been used. The plans were made available to allow the aircraft to be homebuilt and thirty to forty examples have been built around the world.

Variants
FRED Series 1
Prototype, one built.
FRED Series 2
Homebuilt version sold in the form of plans.
FRED Series 3
Improved homebuilt version.

Specifications (FRED Series 2)

References

External links

Popular Flying Association data sheet

1960s British sport aircraft
Homebuilt aircraft
Parasol-wing aircraft
FRED
Single-engined tractor aircraft
Aircraft first flown in 1963